The Bastard of Istanbul is a 2006 novel by Turkish bestselling author Elif Shafak, written originally in English and published by 
Viking Adult. It was translated by Aslı Biçen into her native language Turkish under the title Baba ve Piç in March 2006, and became a bestseller.

Summary
The story is centered around the characters of Asya Kazancı and Armanoush Tchakhmakhchian. It is set in Tucson, Arizona; San Francisco, California; and Istanbul, Turkey. The novel deals with their families and how they are connected through the events of the 1915 Armenian genocide. At age nineteen, Armanoush travels secretly to Istanbul to search for her Armenian roots.

Theatre adaptation
The novel was adapted into a theatre play in Italian language by Angelo Savelli titled La Bastarda Di Istanbul, and was staged by Teatro di Rifredi in Florence, Italy. Its premiere took place on March 3, 2015 starring Turkish actress Serra Yılmaz.

Trial against the author
In June 2006, Kemal Kerinçsiz, a nationalist lawyer, sued Elif Shafak for allegedly "insulting Turkishness" in her novel by dealing with the Armenian Genocide in the last years of the Ottoman Empire. The lawsuit was opened at Istanbul's Beyoğlu district court in accordance with Article 301 of the Turkish Criminal Code. After the prosecutor dropped the charges due to lack of insult, the lawyer refiled his complaint at a higher court, the Beyoglu 2nd Court of First Instance, in July 2006.

Shafak faced a sentence of up to three years in prison for the remarks made in her novel. In September 2006, the court, attended also by Joost Lagendijk, co-chair of the delegation to the EU–Turkey Joint Parliamentary Committee, acquitted her of criminal charges due to lack of legal grounds for the crime in question and insufficient evidence in the controversial trial.

Translations
 Baba ve Piç, by Metis (Istanbul, 2006)
 لقيطة اسطنبول, by منشورات الجمل (Beirut, 2006)
 La Bâtarde d'Istanbul, by Phébus (Paris, 2007)
 Der Bastard von Istanbul, by Eichborn Verlag (Frankfurt am Main, 2007)
  De bastaard van Istanbul, by De Geus (Breda, 2007)
  De volta a Istambul, by Nova Fronteira (Rio de Janeiro, 2007)
  Bastarden fra Istanbul, by Aschehoug (Oslo, 2008)
 La Bastarda di Istanbul, by Biblioteca Universale Rizzoli (Milano, 2009)
 La bastarda de Estambul, by Editorial Lumen (Barcelona, 2009)
 Bastardja e Stambollit, by Bota Shqiptare (Tirana, 2010)
 Bękart ze Stambułu, by Wydawnictwo Literackie (Kraków, 2010)
 Bastarden från Istanbul, by Förlag 2244 (Stockholm, 2011)
 Kirottu Istanbul, by Gummerus (Helsinki, 2012)
 Ստամբուլի բիճը by Antares (Yerevan, 2012)
 Bastarda Instanbulului by Polirom (Bucharest, 2012)
 《伊斯坦布尔孤儿》 by Shanghai Literature & Art Publishing House（Shanghai, 2014）
 A Bastarda de Istambul by Jacarandá Editora (Lisbon, 2015)
 Istanbulsko kopile by Laguna (Belgrade, 2012)
 To μπάσταρδο της Κωνσταντινούπολης by A.A.Livani (Athens, 2007)

References

2006 novels
Novels by Elif Şafak
Novels set in the United States
Novels set in Istanbul
English-language novels
Fiction books about the Armenian genocide
Controversies in Turkey
Literature controversies
Turkish novels adapted into plays